For other inequalities named after Wirtinger, see Wirtinger's inequality.

In the mathematical field of analysis, the Wirtinger inequality is an important inequality for functions of a single variable, named after Wilhelm Wirtinger. It was used by Adolf Hurwitz in 1901 to give a new proof of the isoperimetric inequality for curves in the plane.  A variety of closely related results are today known as Wirtinger's inequality, all of which can be viewed as certain forms of the Poincaré inequality.

Theorem
There are several inequivalent versions of the Wirtinger inequality:
Then

Then

 and equality holds if and only if  for some number .
 Let  be a continuous and differentiable function on the interval  with average value zero. Then

 and equality holds if and only if  for some number .
Despite their differences, these are closely related to one another, as can be seen from the account given below in terms of spectral geometry. They can also all be regarded as special cases of various forms of the Poincaré inequality, with the optimal Poincaré constant identified explicitly. The middle version is also a special case of the Friedrichs inequality, again with the optimal constant identified.

Proofs
The three versions of the Wirtinger inequality can all be proved by various means. This is illustrated in the following by a different kind of proof for each of the three Wirtinger inequalities given above.

Fourier series
Consider the first Wirtinger inequality given above. Take  to be . Since Dirichlet's conditions are met, we can write

By Parseval's identity,

and

and since the summands are all nonnegative, the Wirtinger inequality is proved. Furthermore it is seen that equality holds if and only if  for all , which is to say that . This is equivalent to the stated condition by use of the trigonometric addition formulas.

Integration by parts
Consider the second Wirtinger inequality given above. Take  to be . Any differentiable function  satisfies the identity

Integration using the fundamental theorem of calculus and the boundary conditions  then shows

This proves the Wirtinger inequality, since the second integral is clearly nonnegative.

This is resolved as follows. It follows from the Hölder inequality and  that

which shows that as long as

Functional analysis
Consider the third Wirtinger inequality given above. Take  to be . Because  is a bounded and self-adjoint operator, it follows that

for all  of average value zero, where the equality is due to integration by parts. Then define

This is verified in a standard way, by writing

and applying the Hölder or Jensen inequalities.

This proves the Wirtinger inequality.

To make this argument fully formal and precise, it is necessary to be more careful about the function spaces in question.

Spectral geometry
In the language of spectral geometry, the three versions of the Wirtinger inequality above can be rephrased as theorems about the first eigenvalue and corresponding eigenfunctions of the Laplace–Beltrami operator on various one-dimensional Riemannian manifolds:

These can also be extended to statements about higher-dimensional spaces. For example, the Riemannian circle may be viewed as the one-dimensional version of either a sphere, real projective space, or torus (of arbitrary dimension). The Wirtinger inequality, in the first version given here, can then be seen as the  case of any of the following:

The second and third versions of the Wirtinger inequality can be extended to statements about first Dirichlet and Neumann eigenvalues of the Laplace−Beltrami operator on metric balls in Euclidean space:

Application to the isoperimetric inequality
In the first form given above, the Wirtinger inequality can be used to prove the isoperimetric inequality for curves in the plane, as found by Adolf Hurwitz in 1901. Let  be a differentiable embedding of the circle in the plane. Parametrizing the circle by  so that  has constant speed, the length  of the curve is given by

and the area  enclosed by the curve is given (due to Stokes theorem) by

Since the integrand of the integral defining  is assumed constant, there is

which can be rewritten as

The first integral is clearly nonnegative. Then the Wirtinger inequality can be applied to see that the second integral is also nonnegative, and therefore

which is the isoperimetric inequality.

References

 

 
 
 

Fourier analysis
Inequalities
Theorems in analysis